In order theory, a discipline within mathematics, a critical pair is a pair of elements in a partially ordered set that are incomparable but that could be made comparable without requiring any other changes to the partial order.

Formally, let  be a partially ordered set.

The properties required of critical pairs ensure that, when the relationship  is added, the addition does not cause any violations of the transitive property.

This property may be used to characterize realizers of finite partial orders: A nonempty set  of linear extensions is a realizer if and only if it reverses every critical pair.

References
.

Order theory